The 1948 Quebec general election was held on July 28, 1948, to elect members of the Legislative Assembly of the Province of Quebec, Canada. The incumbent Union Nationale, led by Maurice Duplessis, won re-election, defeating the Quebec Liberal Party, led by Adélard Godbout.

This was the third time (and the second in a row) that Duplessis led his party to a general election victory.

It was Godbout's third (and final) loss to Duplessis in a general election, and the second in a row. He had won one victory against Duplessis years earlier in the 1939 election.  In this election, the Liberals fared particularly poorly, reduced to only 8 seats, although their share of the popular vote was around 36%.

Adjustment of representation
The Legislative Assembly was expanded from 91 to 92 members, as a consequence of Charlevoix-Saguenay no longer returning a joint member, with separate members being elected from Charlevoix and Saguenay.

Results

|-
! colspan=2 rowspan=2 | Political party
! rowspan=2 | Party leader
! colspan=4 | MPPs
! colspan=4 | Votes
|-
! Candidates
!1939
!1944
!±
!#
! ±
!%
! ± (pp)
|-

|style="text-align:left;"|Maurice Duplessis
|91
|48
|82
|34
|775,747
|270,086
|51.25
|13.22
|-

|style="text-align:left;"|Adélard Godbout
|92
|37
|8
|29
|547,478
|24,162
|36.16
|3.19
|-

|style="text-align:left;"|P. Ernest Grégoire
|92
|–
|–
|–
|140,050
|123,508
|9.25
|8.01
|-

|style="text-align:left;"| 
|7
|1
|–
|1
|9,016
|24,970
|0.60
|1.96
|-

|style="text-align:left;"| 
|–
|4
|–
|4
| style="text-align:center;" colspan="4"|did not campaign
|-
|rowspan="10" |  
|style="text-align:left;" colspan="10"|Other candidates
|-
|style="text-align:left;" |
|style="text-align:left;"|–
|11
|–
|2
|2
|23,956
|11,190
|1.58
|0.62
|-
|style="text-align:left;" |
|style="text-align:left;"|–
|–
|1
|–
|1
| style="text-align:center;" colspan="4"|did not campaign
|-
|style="text-align:left;" |
|style="text-align:left;"|–
|8
|–
|–
|–
|8,649
|1,874
|0.57
|0.06
|-
|style="text-align:left;" |
|style="text-align:left;"|–
|1
|–
|–
|–
|4,899
|2,974
|0.32
|0.27
|-
|style="text-align:left;" |
|style="text-align:left;"|–
|7
|–
|–
|–
|2,968
|7,868
|0.20
|0.45
|-
|style="text-align:left;" |
|style="text-align:left;"|–
|1
|–
|–
|–
|1,098
|7,257
|0.07
|0.56
|-
|style="text-align:left;" |
|style="text-align:left;"|–
|1
|–
|–
|–
|110
|2,905
|–
|0.23
|-
|style="text-align:left;" |
|style="text-align:left;"|–
| style="text-align:center;" rowspan="2" colspan="8"|did not campaign
|-
|style="text-align:left;" |
|style="text-align:left;"|–
|-
! colspan="3" style="text-align:left;" | Total
| 311
| 91
! " colspan="2"| 92
! " colspan="2"| 1,513,971
! " colspan="2"| 100%
|-
| colspan="7" style="text-align:left;" | Rejected ballots
| 17,928
| 2,376
| colspan="2"|
|-
| colspan="7" style="text-align:left;" | Voter turnout
| 1,531,899
| 186,388
| 75.22
| 3.24
|-
| colspan="7" style="text-align:left;" | Registered electors
| 2,036,576
| 167,180
| colspan="2"|
|}

See also
 List of Quebec premiers
 Politics of Quebec
 Timeline of Quebec history
 List of Quebec political parties
 23rd Legislative Assembly of Quebec

References

Quebec general election
Elections in Quebec
General election
Quebec general election